Trône (French) or Troon (Dutch) is a Brussels Metro station on the southern segment of lines 2 and 6. It is located under the Small Ring (Brussels' inner ring road) at the /, near the Royal Palace of Brussels, in the municipality of the City of Brussels, Belgium.

The station opened as a premetro (underground tram) station on 20 December 1970 under the name Luxembourg. It became a heavy metro station on 2 October 1988 and its name was changed to reflect the neighbouring / ("Throne Square").

Brussels metro stations
Railway stations opened in 1970
City of Brussels